is a distant trans-Neptunian object and centaur that was discovered  from the Sun, farther than any other currently observable known object in the Solar System. Imaged in January 2018 during a search for the hypothetical Planet Nine, the confirmation of this object was announced in a press release in February 2021 by astronomers Scott Sheppard, David Tholen, and Chad Trujillo. The object was nicknamed "FarFarOut" to emphasize its distance from the Sun.

At a very faint apparent magnitude of 25, only the largest telescopes in the world can observe it. Being so far from the Sun,  moves very slowly among the background stars and has been observed only nine times in the first two years. It requires an observation arc of several years to refine the uncertainties in the approximately 700-year orbital period and determine whether it is currently near or at aphelion (farthest distance from the Sun). JPL Horizons computed an aphelion around the year 2005 at about 133 AU, whereas Project Pluto computed aphelion around the year 1960 slightly further out at 135 AU. Its perihelion is a little less than Neptune's.

Discovery 
 was first imaged on 15 January 2018 by astronomers Scott Sheppard, David Tholen, and Chad Trujillo when they were surveying the sky using the large 8.2-meter Subaru Telescope at Mauna Kea Observatory, Hawaii, to find distant Solar System objects and the hypothetical Planet Nine, whose existence they proposed in 2014. However, it was not noticed until January 2019, when Sheppard decided to review the Subaru images taken in 2018 after having an upcoming lecture delayed by weather. In two of these images taken one day apart in January, he identified a very faint apparent magnitude 25.3 object that moved slowly relative to the background stars and galaxies.

Following 's discovery, Sheppard reobserved the object in March 2019 with the 6.5-meter Magellan-Baade telescope at Las Campanas Observatory, Chile. Additional observations were then made in May 2019 and January 2020 with the Subaru Telescope at Mauna Kea.

Nomenclature 
The object was nicknamed "FarFarOut" for its distant location from the Sun, and particularly because it was even farther than the previous farthest known object  which was nicknamed "Farout". It is officially known by the provisional designation  given by the Minor Planet Center when the discovery was announced. The provisional designation indicates the object's discovery date, with the first letter representing the first half of January and the succeeding letter and numbers indicating that it is the 932nd object discovered during that half-month.

The object has not yet been assigned an official minor planet number by the Minor Planet Center due to its short observation arc and high orbital uncertainty.  will be given a minor planet number when its orbit is well-secured by observations over multiple opposition and will become eligible for naming by its discoverers after it is numbered with a well-defined orbit.

Orbit 
,  has only been observed nine times over an observation arc of two years. Being so far from the Sun,  moves so slowly that two years of observations have not adequately determined its orbit. The nominal orbit is highly uncertain with a condition code of 9. Several years of additional observations are necessary to refine the orbital uncertainties. It comes to opposition each January.

Only 's distance and orbital elements that define its position (inclination and longitude of the ascending node) have been adequately determined by its two-year observation arc. The orbital elements that define the shape and motion of 's orbit (eccentricity, mean anomaly, etc.) are poorly determined because its observation arc does not provide sufficient coverage of its wide-ranging orbit, especially when it moves very slowly due to its large distance.

's small perihelion distance and elongated orbit implies that it has experienced strong gravitational interactions with Neptune in past close encounters. Other trans-Neptunian objects are known to have been scattered onto similarly distant and elongated orbits by Neptune—these are collectively known as scattered disc objects.

Distance 

When it was announced in February 2021,  had an observation arc of two years. , it is the farthest observed object of the Solar System.

However, none of these more distant objects are currently observable even with the most powerful telescopes.

Physical characteristics 

Based on 's apparent brightness and projected distance, the Minor Planet Center calculates an absolute magnitude of 4.2. It is listed as the 12th intrinsically brightest known scattered disc object.

Sheppard estimates that 's diameter lies at the lower end of this range, as he concludes that it has a highly reflective and ice-rich surface.

See also 
 , the next most distant known object discovered in 2018, nicknamed "Farout"
 , the third most distant known object discovered by Sheppard's team in 2020
 , the fourth most distant known object discovered by Sheppard's team in 2020 
 List of Solar System objects most distant from the Sun

Notes

References

External links 
 
 Solar System's Most Distant Known Member Confirmed, Carnegie Institution for Science, 10 February 2021
 Astronomers Confirm Solar System's Most Distant Known Object Is Indeed Farfarout, NOIRLab, 10 February 2021
 Record Breaking Distant Solar-System Object, Subaru Telescope/NAOJ, 10 February 2021
 'Farfarout!' Solar system's most distant planetoid confirmed, University of Hawai'i News, 10 February 2021
 "Beyond Pluto: The Hunt for a Massive Planet X", a talk by Sheppard announcing FarFarOut's discovery, Carnegie Institution for Science, 21 February 2019

Minor planet object articles (unnumbered)

20180115